The Bear Creek Fishweir #2 is a historic fishing weir on Bear Creek in Tishomingo State Park, northeastern Mississippi.  The weir consists of a roughly V-shaped stone construction, built from readily available local sandstone.  The walls of the weir meet closer to the western bank of the creek, where they form a chute estimated to be  in length.  At the end of the chute there would have been a fish trap of wooden construction, of which no traces remain.  The weir was almost certainly maintained by local residents into the early 20th century, but may have been built on the site of an earlier construction by Native Americans.  This weir, along with Bear Creek Fishweir #1, is one of the best-preserved surviving weirs in northeastern Mississippi.

The weir was listed on the National Register of Historic Places in 2007.

See also
 Bear Creek Fishweir No. 1
 National Register of Historic Places listings in Tishomingo County, Mississippi

References

		
National Register of Historic Places in Tishomingo County, Mississippi
Archaeological sites on the National Register of Historic Places in Mississippi
Weirs